Hong Gildong may refer to:

 common Korean placeholder name, similar to John Doe
 Hong Gil-dong (Korean thief)
 Hong Gildong jeon, a Korean novel often translated as The Story of Hong Gildong
 Hong Gildong (character)
Hong Kil-dong (1986 film), North Korean film
 Hong Gil-dong (TV series), a South Korean TV series
 Operation Hong Kil Dong